Roland Jupiter is a series of synthesizers produced by the Roland Corporation.

List

Analog synths
Roland Jupiter-4 (1978)
Roland Jupiter-8 (1981)
Roland Jupiter-6 (1982)
Roland MKS-80 Super Jupiter (1984)

Digital synths
Roland JP-8000 (1996) / JP-8080 (1998)
Roland Jupiter-50 (2011)
Roland Jupiter-80 (2011)
Roland Jupiter-Xm (2019)
Roland Jupiter-X (2020)

Software synths
Roland Cloud Jupiter 8

Jupiter
Musical instruments invented in the 1970s
Musical instruments invented in the 1980s